Alessandro Bardelli (28 April 1914 – 24 August 2009) was an Italian coxswain. He competed at the 1948 Summer Olympics in London with the men's eight where they were eliminated in the semi-final.

References

1914 births
2009 deaths
Italian male rowers
Olympic rowers of Italy
Rowers at the 1948 Summer Olympics
Sportspeople from Varese
Coxswains (rowing)
European Rowing Championships medalists
20th-century Italian people